Victor (?-1555) was a Greek painter in Venice active during the middle part of the 16th century.  The only surviving painting is his self portrait.  He was a painter during the High Renaissance.  He drastically escaped the maniera greca.  He is comparable to Ioannis Permeniates.

History
Victor was probably born in Venice or Crete.  His father's name was Ioannis.  In 1537, he was chosen by the Venetian authorities to fight in the Third Ottoman-Venetian War.  He made out a will on July 10, 1537, the will begins:  Ego Victor filius q. ser Johannis Greci, pictor
de Conflnio Sancii Musis, iturum in classem.  In 1539, O Vetto depentor was a soldier until 1540.  On July 15, 1555, Victor the painter and son of Ioannis was a member of the church of Saint Moses.  In the archives, it stated that Vettorello depentor died.     
The painting is in Giustiniani-Reganati collection in Venice.  The painting is signed ΕΙΣ ΑΦΚΖ' ΜΙΝΙ ΑΥΓΟΥΣΤΟΥ ΚΗ, ΧΕΙΡ βΙΤΟΡΕ

See also
Greek scholars in the Renaissance
Vittore Carpaccio
Giovanni Bellini
Victor (iconographer)
Marco Basaiti

References

Bibliography

1555 deaths
Renaissance painters
Painters from Venice
16th-century Greek painters
16th-century Venetian people
Republic of Venice people of the Ottoman–Venetian Wars
Venetian people of Greek descent